The Tellskapelle ("Tell's chapel") is located on the Tellsplatte or Tellenplatte ("Tell's slab") on the shore of Lake Lucerne at the foot of the Axenberg cliffs (an offshoot ridge of Glärnisch, 1,022 m), in the Sisikon municipality, canton of Uri, Switzerland. It is across the Bay of Uri (Urnersee) from the Rütli, some 4.3 km away.

The Catholic chapel marks the site where according to legend, William Tell during a storm leapt from the boat of his captors (the Tellensprung "leap of Tell") and escaped, allowing him to assassinate the tyrant Gessler and initiate the rebellion that led to the foundation of the Old Swiss Confederacy. The Tellenplatte is first mentioned in 1470 in the White Book of Sarnen, as Tellen blatten.

The current chapel was built in 1879. It is decorated with four frescos by Ernst Stückelberg, realized in 1880-1882.

In music
The incident of the Tellensprung is depicted in the character piece for piano "La chapelle de Guillaume Tell" by Franz Liszt, the first composition in the collection Années de pèlerinage, first year (Switzerland).

References

Further reading
 Historisches Lexikon der Schweiz: Tellskapelle
 Eduard Müller, Martin Fröhlich: Grutli, Rocher de Schiller, Chapelle de Tell. Monuments nationaux au lac d'Uri. (Schweizerische Kunstführer, Nr. 498) publ. Gesellschaft für Schweizerische Kunstgeschichte GSK. Bern 1991, 

William Tell
Roman Catholic chapels in Switzerland
Cultural property of national significance in the canton of Uri
Buildings and structures in the canton of Uri
Roman Catholic churches completed in 1879
19th-century Roman Catholic church buildings in Switzerland